Laxman Shrawan Bhatkar (born 1901 in Thugaon Amravati district - 1970) was a politician and social worker from Central Provinces and Berar of British India. He was born in 1901 at Thugaon village of then Amravati district of the Province. He studied at Depressed Classes Mission High School at Bombay.

Later he became member of Satyasodhak samaj under the guidance of great Maharshi Vitthalramji shide. He used to compose playfolk songs and stories for the welfare of untouchables. For them, he started Chokhamela Hostel at Chikhali in Buldana district in 1921.

In 1951, he was elected to first Lok Sabha from the 2 seats of Buldana Akola constituency of then Madhya Pradesh State along with Gopalrao Khedkar. In 1957, he was re-elected as a representative of the second Lok Sabha from Buldana Akola constituency of then Bombay State. He represented Khamgaon (Lok Sabha constituency) in 3rd Lok Sabha. Along with it they were the Members of Constitution Assembly of India as Members (by province/state) Central Provinces and Berar. 

He died in 1970.

References

1901 births
1970 deaths
People from Buldhana district
People from Amravati district
India MPs 1952–1957
India MPs 1957–1962
Lok Sabha members from Maharashtra
Marathi politicians
India MPs 1962–1967
Indian National Congress politicians from Maharashtra